Gambhir is an Indian (Khatri) surname. Notable people bearing the name Gambhir include:

Daljeet Singh Gambhir, Indian cardiologist
Eenam Gambhir, Indian diplomat
Gautam Gambhir, Indian cricketer
Jasvinder K. Gambhir, Indian doctor and professor
Paru Gambhir, Indian actress
Sanjiv Sam Gambhir, Indian-American physician
Surendra Gambhir, Indian-American writer
Vipul Gambhir, Indian-Entrepreneur 

Surnames of Indian origin
Indian surnames
Punjabi-language surnames
Hindu surnames
Khatri clans
Khatri surnames